Benedict Jackson (born 23 May 1967) is an English professional golfer who has resided in Australia since 1987. During the course of his career, he has won several major golf tournaments, most notably the Western Australian Open in 1995.

Biography 
Jackson was born on 23 May 1967 in the village of Helperby, North Yorkshire. He was educated at the private King's School in Ely, Cambridgeshire.

As a young amateur, Jackson represented the England Boys team in 1984. In 1987, at the age of 19, Jackson emigrated to Australia where he went on to win numerous pro-am events throughout the late 1980s and 1990s. Jackson played in the 1995 Western Australia PGA Championship at Joondalup, finishing second by one stroke. Weeks later, Jackson won the 1995 Western Australian Open in a sudden-death playoff, becoming the first European champion in the tournament's history. He temporarily retired from professional play in 1999.

In 2018, Jackson gained a place on the Australian PGA Legends Tour through qualifying school. He won six events during his first two years on the tour. He won three times in 2021 and once in 2022.

Professional wins (11)

Australasian Foundation Tour wins (1)

PGA Legends Tour (10)

2018
Live Life Group Maleny Legends Pro-Am

2019 
Club Mandalay Legends Pro-Am (tied with Peter Fowler)
Kerry Campbell Homes Fraser Coast Classic (tied with Mike Harwood and Peter Senior)
Bribie Island Legends Pro-Am
Furphy Murrumbidgee Legends Pro-Am (tied with Douglas Maiden and Simon Tooman)
Minder Secure Cloud Services Legends Pro-Am (tied with Steven Aisbett)

2021 
Pacific Harbour Legends Pro-Am
Reeside Communities Pacific Legends Pro-Am
Fidelity Capital Group Charity Legends Pro-Am

2022 
Mike Carney Toyota Townsville Legends Pro-Am

References

External links

English male golfers
PGA Tour of Australasia golfers
People from North Yorkshire
People educated at King's Ely
1967 births
Living people